Glenn Scott Patching (born 12 April 1958) was an Australian backstroke and freestyle swimmer of the 1970s and 1980s, who won the gold medal in the men's 100-metre backstroke event at the 1978 Commonwealth Games.  He represented his native country at two consecutive Summer Olympics, starting in 1976.

See also
 List of Commonwealth Games medallists in swimming (men)

References
 

1958 births
Living people
Australian male backstroke swimmers
Australian male freestyle swimmers
Olympic swimmers of Australia
People from Queensland
Swimmers at the 1976 Summer Olympics
Swimmers at the 1980 Summer Olympics
Swimmers at the 1978 Commonwealth Games
Commonwealth Games gold medallists for Australia
Commonwealth Games silver medallists for Australia
Commonwealth Games bronze medallists for Australia
Commonwealth Games medallists in swimming
20th-century Australian people
Medallists at the 1978 Commonwealth Games